Niculina Vasile (born 13 February 1958) is a retired high jumper from Romania, who set her personal best on 2 June 1985, jumping 1.98 metres at a meet in Bucharest. A three-time national champion (1981, 1982 and 1984), Vasile competed at the 1984 Summer Olympics in Los Angeles, California, where she finished in 11th place (1.85 metres).

References

 Women's World All-Time List

Romanian female high jumpers
Athletes (track and field) at the 1984 Summer Olympics
Olympic athletes of Romania
1958 births
Living people
Place of birth missing (living people)